Season Of Passion is a 1979 romantic novel by American Danielle Steel. The book was originally published on June 1, 1979, by Dell Publications, containing 432 pages. It is Steel's fifth novel.

Synopsis
Kate meeting Tom Harper, a well known pro-football star, widely recognised across the United States. When first meeting, they enjoyed their relationship, however, after an unsuccessful attempt at suicide, Tom becomes mentally and physically disabled for the rest of his life, leaving Kate pregnant with his unborn son, as well upset about recent circumstances. However, after a chance at a new relationship and fresh start, Kate realises she will have to leave the past behind, to move forward.

References

American romance novels
Contemporary romance novels
1979 American novels
Novels by Danielle Steel
Chick lit novels
American football books
Dell Publishing books